Naarda umbria is a species of moth in the family Noctuidae.

References

External links
 

Hypeninae
Moths described in 1902